Like all municipalities of Puerto Rico, Rincón is subdivided into administrative units called barrios, which are roughly comparable to minor civil divisions, (and means wards or boroughs or neighborhoods in English). The barrios and subbarrios, in turn, are further subdivided into smaller local populated place areas/units called sectores (sectors in English). The types of sectores may vary, from normally sector to urbanización to reparto to barriada to residencial, among others. Some sectors appear in two barrios.

List of sectors by barrio

Atalaya
Calle Los Vega
Carretera 411
Ramal 412
Sector Delfín González
Sector Justo Agrón
Sector La Bandera
Sector La Galleta

Barrero
Carretera 115
Carretera 429
Condominio Sol y Playa
Punta Cadena
Sector La Mancha
Sector La Playa
The Villas at the Horned Dorset Primavera

Calvache
Acres de Córcega
Calle Ajacio
Calle Bastia
Calle Caleta Los Frailes
Calle Calvi
Calle Corte
Calle El Cielo
Calle Invierno
Calle La Moca
Calle Occhiatanna
Calle Otoño
Calle Poggio Doletta
Calle Porto Vecchio
Calle Primavera
Calle Puesta del Sol
Calle Rue de Córsica
Calle Verano
Carretera 115
Carretera 411
Comunidad Agrícola Bianchi
Comunidad Calvache
Condominio Córcega Apartments
Condominio Costa Córcega
Condominio Las Coronas
Condominio Los Almendros
Condominio Pelican Reef
Condominio Rincón Ocean Club I y II
Condominio Victoria del Mar
Cruces Nuevas
Sector Benito González
Sector Campo Alegre
Sector Córcega
Sector El Salto (El Último Brinco)
Sector Hacienda Juanita
Sector La Jalda o Camino Anselmo
Sector Las Lomas
Sector Los Muelles
Sector Palatine Hill
Sector Pico Carrero
Sector Toño Olán
Urbanización Valle Escondido

Cruces
Carretera 412
Cruz Medio
Sector Danubio
Sector Emiliano González
Sector Feliciano
Sector Juan Soto
Sector La Rincoeña
Sector Los Gandía
Sector Los Puentes
Sector Mito Caro
Sector Ríos
Sector Rosado
Sector Sierra Maestra
Sector Soto
Sector William Noriega Rodríguez

Ensenada
Calle Gabino Tirado
Calle Sol
Camino José Pérez
Carretera 115
Carretera 413
Colinas de Ensenada
Condominio Arenas del Mar
Condominio Bahía del Mar
Condominio Chalet del Mar
Condominio Costa Ensenada
Condominio Ensenada del Mar
Condominio Rincón By The Seas
Condominio Rincón Ocean View
Condominio Rincón Wave View
Condominio Solymar
Extensión Jardines de Rincón
Parada Muñoz
Sección Cambijas
Sector Ensenada
Sector Ismael Sánchez
Sector Quintana
Urbanización Jardines de Rincón
Urbanización Vista Azul

Jagüey
Carretera 411
Carretera 412
Jagüey Chiquito
Ramal 4412
Sector Colombani
Sector Lucía Lorenzo
Sector Suárez

Pueblo

Avenida Albizu Campos
Avenida Canal
Avenida Vistamar
Barrio Pueblo Rural
Calle Borinquen Sea Beach Drive
Calle Encanto
Calle Fisherman Walk
Calle Francisco Colón Guerra
Calle Germán Chaparro Villanueva
Calle Los Robles
Calle Muñoz Rivera
Calle Muñoz Rivera
Calle Pelican Walk
Calle Vistamar
Camino Vistamar
Carretera 115
Carretera 412
Carretera 414 (Camino Mortero)
Cofresí Tower
Comunidad Stella
Condominio Coconut Court
Condominio Puerta del Sol
Condominio Puesta del Sol
Condominio Sea Beamorrench Village
Condominio Stella del Mar
Extensión Los Robles
Reparto Matías
Sector El Coquí
Sector La Jalda o Camino Anselmo
Sector Los Caobos
Sector Maní
Sector Muñoz
Sector Soto
Sector Vargas
Sector Villa Rincón
Sectores Korea
Urbanización Colinas Monte y Mar
Urbanización Sea Beach Colony
Urbanización Villa Rincón
Vertedero
Villa Angélica
Villa Cofresí
Villas de la Pradera

Puntas
Calle Boulevard
Calle Colinas Lindas
Calle Los Flamboyanes
Camino Interior
Camino Martillo
Camino Vista Nuclear
Carretera 413
Centro Puntas
Condominio Landing View Village
Paseo Tirado Sánchez
Punta Higüera
Puntas Nuevas
Ramal 413
Sector Alfonso Arizmendi
Sector Brisas
Sector Buena Vista
Sector Cielo Mar
Sector Colinas Lindas
Sector Collazo
Sector Cuchillo de Piñas
Sector Dominga Cardona
Sector Ismael Sánchez
Sector Los Cipreses
Sector Los Flamboyanes
Sector Trinitarias
Sector Vereno
Sector Vista Linda

Rincón barrio-pueblo
Calle Benjamín Gómez
Calle Comercio
Calle del Parque
Calle Muñoz Rivera
Calle Nueva
Calle Progreso
Calle Unión
Cerro Los Pobres
Cerro Miramar
Condominio Santa Rosa Elderly
Residencial Santa Rosa
Sector Sol

Río Grande
Carretera 115
Carretera 400
Carretera 413
Carretera 414 (Camino Mortero)
Sector Arizona
Sector Cuchillo de Piñas
Sector Domingo Vargas
Sector Lomas Los Gavilanes
Sector Los Mangoes
Sector Mingo Mela
Sector Moreno
Sector Pedro Rosado
Urbanización Estancias de Río Grande
Urbanización Palma Real
Urbanización Punta del Mar Beach Village
Urbanización Veredas de Río Grande

See also

 List of communities in Puerto Rico

References

Rincón
Rincón